Kundiawa-Gembogl District is a district of the Simbu Province of Papua New Guinea.  Its capital is Kundiawa.  The population was 78,521 at the 2011 census.

References

Districts of Papua New Guinea
Chimbu Province